In computing, CHILL (an acronym for CCITT High Level Language) is a procedural programming language designed for use in telecommunication switches (the hardware used inside telephone exchanges). The language is still used for legacy systems in some telecommunication companies and for  signal box programming.

The CHILL language is similar in size and complexity to the original Ada language. The first specification of the CHILL language was published in 1980, a few years before Ada.

ITU provides a standard CHILL compiler.
A free CHILL compiler was bundled with GCC up to version 2.95, however, was removed from later versions. An object-oriented version, called Object CHILL, was developed also.

ITU is responsible for the CHILL standard, known as ITU-T Rec. Z.200. The equivalent ISO standard is ISO/IEC 9496:2003. (The text of the two documents is the same). In late 1999 CCITT stopped maintaining the CHILL standard.

CHILL was used in systems of Alcatel System 12 and Siemens EWSD, for example.

See also 
 PLEX - Programming Language for Exchanges
 Erlang - language from Ericsson originally designed for telecommunication switches

References

External links
 ITU Z.200 standard page, has freely downloadable CHILL spec
 The CHILL Homepage
 Documentation for GNU CHILL

Procedural programming languages
ITU-T recommendations
Legacy systems
Programming languages created in 1980
Programming languages with an ISO standard